Wildy Petoud (born 1957) is a Swiss science fiction writer who won the Prix Rosny-Aîné in 1993. She also wrote the story Nocturne with Emmanuel Jouanne and translated a story by Jean-Claude Dunyach for On Spec.

References

External links
Picture of her (She is the one without a beard or moustache)

1957 births
Living people
Swiss science fiction writers
Women science fiction and fantasy writers